Luiseño may refer to:
the Luiseño people
the Luiseño language
 Luiseño traditional narratives
 USS Luiseno (ATF-156)